The men's 3 metre springboard diving competition at the 2016 Summer Olympics in Rio de Janeiro was held on 15 and 16 August at the Maria Lenk Aquatic Center in Barra da Tijuca.

Format 
The competition was held in three rounds:
 Preliminary round: All 29 divers perform six dives; the top 18 divers advance to the semi-final.
 Semi-final: The 18 divers perform six dives; the scores of the qualifications are erased and the top 12 divers advance to the final.
 Final: The 12 divers perform six dives; the semi-final scores are erased and the top three divers win the gold, silver and bronze medals accordingly.

Schedule 
All times are Brasília time (UTC−3)

Results

References

Diving at the 2016 Summer Olympics
2016
Men's events at the 2016 Summer Olympics